Gim Eung-hwan (1742–1789), also known as Kim Eung-hwan, was a painter of the late Joseon period. He entered royal service as a member of the Dohwaseo, the official painters of the Joseon court. Gim Eung-hwan is known for Danwon's teacher and good at sansuhwa (landscape painting).

See also
Korean painting
List of Korean painters
Korean art
Korean culture

External links
Brief biography and gallery (in Korean)

1742 births
1789 deaths
18th-century Korean painters
Gim clan of Kaesong